The 2020 South Carolina Democratic presidential primary took place on February 29, 2020 and was the fourth nominating contest in the Democratic Party primaries for the 2020 presidential election. The South Carolina primary was an open primary and awarded 64 delegates to the 2020 Democratic National Convention, of which 54 were pledged delegates allocated on the basis of the results of the primary. Former vice president Joe Biden and senator Bernie Sanders were the only candidates to earn delegates. Biden won 48.7% of the popular vote and notably placed first in every county in the state; it was his first ever win in a presidential primary. Sanders came in second place and won 19.8% of the popular vote. Businessman Tom Steyer, who had staked his entire campaign on the state, placed third but did not surpass the threshold and dropped out of the race, endorsing Biden.

The primary was widely interpreted as a turning point for the 2020 primaries, with Joe Biden gaining momentum going into the pivotal Super Tuesday races three days later. Following successes in the previous primaries, former mayor Pete Buttigieg and senator Amy Klobuchar received very disappointing results and initially wanted to stay in the race, but they both suspended their campaigns shortly before Super Tuesday and endorsed Biden on the day before. While Biden and former mayor Michael Bloomberg were left as the only moderates afterwards, the majority coalesced around Biden in the race against left-wing candidates Sanders and senator Elizabeth Warren.

Procedure
Primary elections were held on Saturday, February 29, 2020. In the open primary, candidates had to meet a viability threshold of 15 percent at the congressional district or statewide level in order to be considered viable. The 54 pledged delegates to the 2020 Democratic National Convention were allocated proportionally on the basis of the results of the primary. Of these, 35 were allocated on the basis of the results within each congressional district, between 3 and 8 were allocated to each of the state's seven congressional districts. Another 7 were allocated to party leaders and elected officials (PLEO delegates), in addition to 12 at-large delegates.

The precinct reorganization meetings subsequently were held on March 14, 2020, to choose delegates for the county conventions, directly followed by county conventions until March 31, to elect delegates to the state convention. On May 30, 2020, the state convention met in Columbia to elect all pledged national convention delegates. Delegates were allowed to participate from remote places due to the COVID-19 pandemic. The delegation also included 10 unpledged PLEO delegates: 8 members of the Democratic National Committee and 2 representatives from Congress.

Voting was done by each voter selecting choices on a screen, so the machine printed a ballot with chosen names and a bar code. Voters could check the printed names before putting the ballot in the ballot box, though few do that. A scanner counted the bar codes, not the names, and no audit was required to check if the machines worked correctly.

Voters could absentee vote in-person until February 28, 2020, at 5:00 pm local time (EST) or submit absentee votes by mail. Election officials recommended applying to absentee vote by-mail a week in advance so that voters had time to receive their absentee ballot and mail it in by election day. Polling places closed at 7:00 pm; however, anyone standing in line at 7:00 pm were still allowed to vote.

Candidates
There was a $20,000 filing fee to get on the ballot, the largest in the nation. Along with the filing fee, an application was required to be submitted to the South Carolina State committee by December 4, 2019.

The following candidates were placed on the ballot:

Joe Biden
Pete Buttigieg
Tulsi Gabbard
Amy Klobuchar
Bernie Sanders
Tom Steyer
Elizabeth Warren
Michael Bennet (withdrawn)
Cory Booker (withdrawn)
John Delaney (withdrawn)
Deval Patrick (withdrawn)
Andrew Yang (withdrawn)

Additionally, Julian Castro and Marianne Williamson were both accepted onto the ballot, but withdrew soon enough that they did not appear on the ballot.  Write-in votes are not permitted in South Carolina party primaries.

Polling

Results

Official results show that Joe Biden won the Democratic primary with 48.65% of the vote, with Bernie Sanders coming in second with 19.77%.

Results by county
Biden won every county.

Aftermath
Joe Biden's overwhelming victory, his first-ever primary win in his three presidential runs, gave his campaign new momentum going into Super Tuesday after lackluster performances in Iowa and New Hampshire and a distant second-place finish in Nevada. The Biden campaign claimed that the outcome proved he had the most diverse coalition of any Democratic candidate, as Iowa's and New Hampshire's Democratic electorates are over 90% white, while South Carolina's Democratic electorate is nearly 60% black. Biden's success in the primary helped him overtake the lead in the then-popular vote from front-runner Bernie Sanders, who came in second.

Despite Pete Buttigieg's initial claims that he would stay in the race following the primary, he suspended his presidential campaign the next day. In his concession speech, Buttigieg claimed he would have a negative effect on the race if he stayed in, which many took as Buttigieg not wanting to split the moderate vote in order to assist Biden. However, while Buttigieg called Biden before making his announcement, he did not immediately endorse him. One day later, on the day before Super Tuesday, Buttigieg publicly endorsed Biden while speaking at Biden's rally in Dallas, Texas.

Elizabeth Warren and Amy Klobuchar both had lackluster performances in South Carolina. However, both candidates stated that they expected the outcome and still had a strong chance of doing well on Super Tuesday. Nonetheless, on March 2, two days after the primary and the day before Super Tuesday, Klobuchar dropped out of the race and endorsed Biden.

Billionaire Tom Steyer, whose campaign was reliant on getting the black vote, dropped out after a lackluster performance in the state. Steyer's campaign had concentrated its advertising efforts on South Carolina, spending more money on television commercials in the state than all the other Democratic candidates combined. Steyer stated in his concession speech that he did not see a path to winning the presidency based on the results.

On February 28, 2020, former Governor of Virginia Terry McAuliffe stated that he would consider endorsing Biden if he performed well in the South Carolina primary. Shortly after it was announced that Biden would win the South Carolina primary, McAuliffe announced his endorsement on CNN. In the following days, Biden received a slew of endorsements, including Virginia Congressman Robert C. Scott, U.S. senator from Illinois Tammy Duckworth (who held the Senate seat once occupied by Barack Obama), former Senate Majority Leader Harry Reid, and former 2020 candidates Pete Buttigieg, Amy Klobuchar, Beto O'Rourke, and Virginia Senator and former 2016 vice presidential nominee Tim Kaine.

Analysis
Participation in the 2020 South Carolina presidential primary was significantly higher than it was in the 2016 presidential primary. Official election results indicate that 539,263 votes were cast. This total represented a marked increase over 2016's 370,904 votes and even a slightly higher amount than 2008's 532,468 votes.

Biden's win was deemed a major victory, as he won all 46 counties in the state. The win was largely attributed to his support from 61% of African-American voters (African-American voters make up approximately 60% of the Democratic electorate in South Carolina). Before the primary on February 26, House Majority Whip and longtime U.S. Representative Jim Clyburn endorsed Biden. Many cited Clyburn's endorsement as a reason for Biden's wide margin of victory, as Clyburn's endorsement was a deciding factor for many African American voters in South Carolina. Thirty-six percent of all primary voters said that they made their decision after Clyburn's endorsement; of that total, 70% voted for Biden. According to FiveThirtyEight, the outcome significantly boosted Biden's chance of winning multiple Super Tuesday states (especially southern states like North Carolina, Texas, and Virginia).

Sanders came in second place in the primary. He received an estimated 14% of the African-American vote, down from 16% in 2016. Even in the Upstate region of the state, which was seen as friendly towards Sanders, Biden won every county, although his margin of victory was smaller in that region than it was in other parts of South Carolina.

Following the South Carolina primary, pollsters and analysts claimed that Buttigieg, Warren, and Klobuchar were losing momentum at a critical time in the race. Exit polls showed that Buttigieg, who won Iowa and did well in New Hampshire, received only 2% of the black vote despite receiving endorsements from many prominent African Americans. Klobuchar and Warren received little support in South Carolina, possibly because of black voters' lack of familiarity with them.

Following their poor performances, Pete Buttigieg, Amy Klobuchar, and Tom Steyer ended their presidential campaigns before Super Tuesday. This meant that moderate voters coalesced instead of splitting their votes between multiple candidates, giving Joe Biden multiple comeback wins on Super Tuesday.

Notes

References

External links
The Green Papers delegate allocation summary
South Carolina Democratic Party draft delegate selection plan 
FiveThirtyEight South Carolina primary poll tracker
The Post and Courier South Carolina candidate tracker

South Carolina Democratic
Democratic primary
2020